Ameiva jacuba is a species of teiid lizard endemic to Brazil.

References

Ameiva
Reptiles described in 2013
Lizards of South America
Reptiles of Brazil
Taxa named by Guarino R. Colli